Birch Lake is a lake in Cass County, Minnesota, in the United States.

Birch Lake is an English translation of the native Ojibwe-language name.

See also
List of lakes in Minnesota

References

Lakes of Minnesota
Lakes of Cass County, Minnesota